The Elizabeth Cleveland Intermediate School, also known as Elizabeth Cleveland Middle School, is a historic building located at 13322 Conant Street in Detroit, Michigan. It was listed on the National Register of Historic Places in 2015.  The school is an excellent example of Collegiate Gothic style, with no  alteration to its exterior since construction. The building is still in use as a school, and now houses Frontier International Academy.

History
The Detroit Public School District began planning for construction of the Elizabeth Cleveland Intermediate School in 1926, by acquiring land and engaging the architectural firm of Donaldson and Meier. Construction began in 1927, and opened to students in September of that year. The school remained a middle school until 2006, when it became a 6-12 school. The school closed in 2009, and remained vacant until 2012, when a charter school bought the property. In September 2013 the school partially reopened as the Frontier International Academy.

Description
The Elizabeth Cleveland Intermediate School is located on a large corner lot, positioned diagonally facing the intersection. The building is a two-story orange brick flat-roofed structure, with the facade divided into nineteen bays. The central bay projects forward, and is surmounted by a high parapet wall. Two bays to either side of the center are a pair of entrance pavilions, topped with square turrets.

The entry pavilions contain terrazzo-floor vestibules. The building contains academic classrooms, four shops, a drafting room, two "clothing rooms,"  two "food centers," an auditorium, a gymnasium, pool, and locker rooms.

References

External links
Frontier International Academy

National Register of Historic Places in Detroit
Public middle schools in Michigan
Detroit Public Schools Community District
1927 establishments in Michigan
School buildings completed in 1927
2009 disestablishments in Michigan
Educational institutions disestablished in 2009